Jack Thomas Leiter (born April 21, 2000) is an American professional baseball pitcher in the Texas Rangers organization. He played college baseball for the Vanderbilt Commodores and was selected by the Rangers with the second overall pick of the 2021 MLB draft.

Amateur career
Raised in Summit, New Jersey, Leiter attended Delbarton School in Morristown, New Jersey, where he played baseball and was teammates with Anthony Volpe. In July 2018, he played in the 2018 Under Armour All-America Baseball Game. In December, he played on the USA Baseball 18U National Team in Panama City during the 2018 COPABE Pan-American Championships, helping Team USA win a gold medal. As a senior at Delbarton in 2019, he was named the Gatorade Player of the Year for the state of New Jersey. At the time of his selection, he was 6–0 with a 0.54 ERA while also batting .364. Leiter was considered a top prospect for the 2019 Major League Baseball draft, but due to his strong commitment to Vanderbilt University, was not selected until the 20th round by the New York Yankees. He did not sign and instead enrolled at Vanderbilt to play college baseball.

In his college debut on February 18, 2020, Leiter pitched five no-hit innings while striking out 12, leading Vanderbilt to a 3–0 victory over the University of South Alabama. He was named the Southeastern Conference (SEC) Co-Freshman of the Week following the performance. Over 15 innings, Leiter went 2–0 with a 1.72 ERA before the college baseball season was cancelled due to the COVID-19 pandemic. As a redshirt freshman in 2021, Leiter returned as a member of Vanderbilt's starting rotation. On March 20, 2021, he pitched a no-hitter in his SEC debut against South Carolina, compiling sixteen strikeouts. In his next start, he pitched seven no-hit innings against Missouri. He was named the SEC Newcomer of the Year alongside being selected a consensus first-team All-American. He helped lead Vanderbilt to the 2021 College World Series finals and was named to the All-Tournament team. Leiter ended the 2021 season having started 18 games, in which he compiled an 11–4 record, a 2.13 ERA, and 179 strikeouts over 110 innings. He was named the Baseball America 2021 Freshman of the Year.

Professional career
Leiter was selected by the Texas Rangers with the second overall selection in the 2021 Major League Baseball draft. Leiter signed with Texas on July 28, 2021, receiving a $7.92 million signing bonus. Leiter attended an organization draftee orientation at the Rangers spring training complex after signing, but did not appear in a professional game in 2021, instead choosing to return to Vanderbilt to continue college course work.

Leiter opened the 2022 season with the Frisco RoughRiders of the Double-A Texas League. He made his professional debut on April 9, going three innings while allowing one run and striking out seven batters. He was selected to represent the Rangers at the 2022 All-Star Futures Game. Over 23 games (22 starts) with Frisco, Leiter went 3-10 with a 5.54 ERA, 56 walks, and 109 strikeouts over 92 innings. He received a non-roster invitation to major league spring training in 2023.

Personal life
Leiter's father, Al Leiter, pitched in MLB for 19 seasons. His uncle Mark Leiter also played in MLB, and his cousin, Mark Leiter Jr., currently plays professional baseball.

References

External links

Vanderbilt Commodores bio

2000 births
Living people
All-American college baseball players
Baseball players from New Jersey
Baseball pitchers
Delbarton School alumni
Frisco RoughRiders players
People from Summit, New Jersey
Sportspeople from Union County, New Jersey
Vanderbilt Commodores baseball players
United States national baseball team players